David Behrman (born August 16, 1937) is an American composer and a pioneer of computer music. In the early 1960s he was the producer of Columbia Records' Music of Our Time series, which included the first recording of Terry Riley's In C. In 1966 Behrman co-founded Sonic Arts Union with fellow composers Robert Ashley, Alvin Lucier and Gordon Mumma. He wrote the music for Merce Cunningham's dances Walkaround Time (1968), Rebus (1975), Pictures (1984) and Eyespace 40 (2007). In 1978, he released his debut album On the Other Ocean, a pioneering work combining computer music with live performance.

Biography

Early life and education
Behrman's father, S. N. Behrman, was a successful playwright and Hollywood screenplay writer. His mother Elza Heifetz Behrman was the sister of violinist Jascha Heifetz.

Behrman attended the Phillips Academy in Andover, Massachusetts, where his classmates included Carl Andre, Hollis Frampton and Frank Stella. There he also developed a lifelong friendship with composer and pianist Frederic Rzewski. While attending summer camp at Indian Hill in 1953 he was taught modern music by Wallingford Riegger. He studied music at Harvard from 1955 to 1959, where he formed a lifelong friendship with Christian Wolff and where he continued his friendship with Frederic Rzewski. He attended the summer school at Darmstadt in 1959, where he met La Monte Young and Nam June Paik. He received a Master of Arts from Columbia University in 1963.

Teaching
He has been a member of the Avery Graduate Arts Program faculty at Bard College since 1998. He was co-director of the Center for Contemporary Music at Mills College in 1975–1980, and has taught also at the California Institute of the Arts, Ohio State University, Rutgers University, and the Technical University of Berlin.

Music
Behrman is known as a minimalist composer. His music has often involved interactions between live performers and computers, usually with the computer generating sounds triggered by some aspect of the live performance, usually certain pitches, but sometimes other aspects of the live sound, such as volume in QRSL (as recorded by Maggi Payne on The Extended Flute (CRI807). Many of his significant works, such as On the Other Ocean, Interspecies Small Talk, and others have been released on Lovely Music.

Personal life
Behrman was briefly married to Japanese video artist, sculptor and avant-garde performance artist Shigeko Kubota. The marriage ended in 1969. He has been married since 1979 to media-artist Terri Hanlon.

Behrman lives in New York City.

Awards
 1994, Foundation for Contemporary Arts Grants to Artists Award.

Discography
On the Other Ocean Lovely Music Ltd. (1977)
Leapday Night Lovely Music Ltd. (1987)
Unforeseen Events XI Records (1991)
Wave Train Alga Marghen (1998)
My Dear Siegfried XI Records (2005)

Films
1976 - Music With Roots in the Aether: Opera for Television. Tape 1: David Behrman. Produced and directed by Robert Ashley. New York, New York: Lovely Music.
2008 - Roulette TV: David Behrman. Roulette Intermedium Inc.

External links
David Behrman Website
David Behrman interview from Kalvos & Damian New Music Bazaar
Lovely Music Artist: David Behrman
David Behrman Interview by Theresa Stern (August 1997)
David Behrman at UbuWeb
David Behrman page at WFMU
David Behrman at the Foundation for Contemporary Arts
David Behrman at Diapason Gallery
David Behrman at Bard College
David Behrman at Arcane Candy

References

1937 births
Living people
20th-century American composers
20th-century classical composers
20th-century American male musicians
21st-century classical composers
21st-century American composers
21st-century American male musicians
American experimental musicians
American male classical composers
American classical composers
Columbia University alumni
Harvard University alumni
Phillips Academy alumni
Pupils of Karlheinz Stockhausen
Bard College faculty
California Institute of the Arts faculty
Ohio State University faculty
Mills College faculty
Rutgers University faculty
Academic staff of the Technical University of Berlin
People from New York City
Austrian emigrants to the United States